Delta Sigma Phi, commonly known as Delta Sig or D Sig, is a fraternity established in 1899 at The City College of New York (CCNY). It was the first fraternity to be founded on the basis of religious and ethnic acceptance. It is also one of three fraternities founded at CCNY (now a part of the City University of New York (CUNY)). Delta Sigma Phi is also a charter member of the North American Interfraternity Conference. The fraternity's national headquarters are located in Indianapolis, Indiana, at the Fairbanks Mansion, the former home of Charles Warren Fairbanks, the U.S. vice president under Theodore Roosevelt.

Since its inception, Delta Sigma Phi has chartered chapters at 233 different colleges and universities, with 108 actively operating undergraduate chapters and colonies ("new chapters") across the United States today. Currently, the fraternity has more than 6,000 undergraduate active members and more than 85,000 living alumni members. More than 150,000 men have been initiated into Delta Sigma Phi since its founding.

History

Beginnings
At the end of the nineteenth century, most fraternities were exclusively Christian or Jewish, and barred membership to individuals on the basis of religion. When a group of friends at the City College of New York tried to join a fraternity, they were denied membership because their group was composed of Christians and Jews. In response, they organized the first Delta Sigma Phi chapter on Dec. 10, 1899. The chapter was called Insula due to its location in Manhattan. In late 1902, with five members from Insula signing incorporation papers, Delta Sigma Phi was incorporated with the purpose to spread "the principles of friendship and brotherhood among college men, without respect to race or creed." By 1903 the fraternity had established chapters at Columbia University and New York University.

The Founders

Delta Sigma Phi recognizes Charles A. Tonsor Jr. (Christian) and Meyer Boskey (Jewish) as its two primary founding fathers. Although Boskey was one of the original members at the City College of New York and Tonsor was one of the charter members of the chapter at New York University, it is believed the fraternity first was developed by a group of nearly a dozen men. During the short period when men of Jewish faith were barred membership, many of the fraternity's founding documents were ruined. Given the circumstances, the national organization adopted both Boskey and Tonsor as the "founders" given their lifelong commitment to the fraternity and their service as visionaries for the development of the fraternity's ritual and national expansion.

Growth and World War I
In the two years after the 1914 Convention, Delta Sigma Phi almost doubled in size with the addition of 10 chapters. In 1915, the first West Coast chapter, Hilgard Chapter at UC Berkeley was installed. Hilgard Chapter was named after a dean at the university and is the fraternity's only chapter without a Greek letter designation, taking the place of Xi Chapter.

Also in 1914, the fraternity decided to admit only white men of the Christian faith, thus rejecting the founders' vision. Many Jewish members and other minorities left Delta Sigma Phi or joined others, including Meyer Boskey, who withdrew active participation in the fraternity for an extended period of time.

As a testament to the geographic shift of the fraternity, the 1916 convention was held in Chicago, Illinois. By this time, Delta Sigma Phi had expanded the number of staff and a national headquarters was created at the Riebold Building at Dayton, Ohio.

When the United States entered World War I in 1917 Delta Sigma Phi had more than 1,000 initiates and 19 active chapters. During the course of the war better than three-quarters of the fraternity's membership served the government in some capacity with half of that number in combat duty overseas. Publication of The Carnation, the fraternity's magazine, and the 1917 and 1918 conventions were suspended for the duration of the war.

Even though the colleges and universities remained open during the war many chapters suspended their operations when most of their members were called to service. Some chapters never recovered from the disruptions of World War I.

The Roaring Twenties
Delta Sigma Phi went through continued expansion during the 1920s, at which time many local fraternities and other social clubs petitioned for fraternity membership. Among these was Phi Nu fraternity at McGill University in Montreal, Quebec, Canada. When Phi Nu was chartered as the Alpha Omicron Chapter, Delta Sigma Phi became an international fraternity. Two of these chapters, the Alpha Theta Chapter at The University of Michigan and the Alpha Chi Chapter at Stetson University, were local organizations older than Delta Sigma Phi itself.

It was also during this time Delta Sigma Phi published its first pledge manual, the Gordian Knot. It was based upon a manual previously published by the Epsilon Chapter at Penn State. The Gordian Knot is considered to be one of the first pledge manuals to be published on a fraternity-wide basis. Another tradition started at this time was the Sailors' Ball, first held at the Alpha Chi Chapter at Stetson University. Today, the Sailors' Ball is an annual event that is a semi-formal counterpart to the Carnation Ball, the fraternity's formal banquet.

The Alpha Eta Chapter at Ohio Northern University in Ada, Ohio was founded in 1920.

Depression and World War II
Two months after the Wall Street Crash of 1929, Delta Sigma Phi's yearly convention was held in Richmond, Virginia. Despite the financial uncertainties of the time, a traveling secretary was added to the fraternity payroll. During the Great Depression the national fraternity's growth had ground to a halt; college enrollments declined and those who attended college were less likely to be able to afford joining a fraternity. Several chapters became dormant and lost their equity in chapter properties. Among them were Alpha and Gamma; the remaining chapters in New York City.

The only chapters founded during the Great Depression were Beta Kappa at the University of Alabama and Beta Lambda at Wake Forest. It also was during this time Executive Director A.W. Defenderfer moved the fraternity headquarters to his insurance offices in Washington, DC. Delta Sigma Phi was re-incorporated in Washington, DC in 1929.

Although the fraternity was rebounding by the late 1930s, World War II caused a disruption within the fraternity. Many members joined the war effort, leaving the chapters weak. It was during this time that the fraternity's only Canadian chapter at McGill University became dormant, with many of its members joining to Commonwealth Forces. By 1944, only 11 of the fraternity's 43 chapters were active.

Return to the founders' vision

After the war, the GI Bill gave many veterans the opportunity to attend college. With an influx of new students, many of the dormant chapters were re-activated. Another consequence of the GI Bill was the establishment of many new public universities. With more institutions open to fraternities, Delta Sigma Phi, along with many other Greek organizations, experienced its greatest period of growth in the Post-World War II era.

In the late 1940s, college administrators across the country began to refuse expansion to fraternities with restrictive rules on membership. In response to the new rules, Delta Sig leadership amended the constitution of the national fraternity to remove all references to race or religion. However, the line "the belief in God is essential to our welfare" in the preamble was untouched and remains so to this day.

In a compromise to several southern chapters, the amendments to the constitution were approved at the 1949 convention while language barring the initiation of non-white and non-Christians was inserted into the fraternity ritual. Since the ritual was a private document and the constitution a public one, this compromise appeased those who resisted integration of the fraternity while allowing it to expand to new universities.

The 1950s were a turbulent time for fraternities and sororities in general. While most of the national Greek-letter organizations still had rules restricting membership, a few chapters bucked the edicts and initiated Jews and African Americans. Some of those chapters were suspended by their national organizations, while others disaffiliated from their national organizations and "went local." In 1957 the California Legislature threatened to pass Assembly Bill 758, which prohibited state universities and colleges from recognizing any student organization that "restricts its membership on the basis of either race, color, religion or national origin." Two years later the regents of the University of California passed a regulation requiring all fraternities and sororities to sign a certificate stating the organization did not have any discriminatory policies. Failure to comply could mean the loss of recognition.

Delta Sigma Phi faced these issues at its 1959 convention. While the organization was interested in maintaining its California chapters, there was opposition to any plan to integrate the entire fraternity. Several southern chapters passed resolutions against any relaxation of racial and religious restrictions and threatened to withdraw from the fraternity. A compromise again was reached where the current rules were not to be changed but exemptions were granted to chapters in danger to losing their recognition due to fraternity policies. The California chapters immediately were given exemptions.

In 1962, the Pennsylvania State System of Higher Education joined the University of California by requiring the integration of its fraternities and sororities. Exemptions were given to the chapters in Pennsylvania. While exemptions originally were granted to chapters in danger of losing recognition with their universities, the Beta Iota Chapter at Wittenberg University received a special exemption. It intended to initiate an African American who was an All-American athlete and an outstanding scholar and the fraternity responded by offering an exemption, likely to avoid bad publicity.

The process of full integration was slow and awkward. As a result of a number of compromises the fraternity remained intact on a national level. When Civil Rights legislation was enacted, Delta Sigma Phi was once more a universal brotherhood of man, just as the founders intended.

The fraternity in the 21st century
Today, Delta Sigma Phi consists of 107 chapters and colonies across the United States. At the 2005 convention, the fraternity adopted "Vision 2025," a plan to transform Delta Sigma Phi into "America's Leading Fraternity" by the year 2025 with aggressive goals for leadership training, alumni involvement, and new chapter development. The goal is for Delta Sigma Phi to rank within the top three to five of any quantitative measurement of national fraternities in the NIC.
Delta Sigma Phi also adopted the American Red Cross as its national philanthropy. Members are urged to support the endeavors of the non-profit and raise funds. Since the adoption of the American Red Cross and "Vision 2025," Delta Sigma Phi aims to be recognized as "Men of Action" in their recruitment and development philosophy. These are highlighted in the 2009 call to action video titled "All In."
 	
Among the initiatives laid out in Vision 2025, the fraternity provided leadership education to all of its undergraduates by 2015, developed "The Summit" to train all presidents and recruitment chairmen with professional recruitment techniques, and open between eight and 12 chapters annually with a goal of reaching 200 undergraduate chapters by 2025. Rather than closing struggling chapters with small memberships, the fraternity actively redeveloped them as they would develop a brand-new chapter.

Delta Sigma Phi became the first fraternity to create a partnership with Phired Up Productions, a fraternity and sorority recruitment consulting company, to coach its New Chapter Development team. Since the partnership began in 2009, Delta Sigma Phi has broken its record for number of men recruited for a colony three times, most recently in 2012 when a group at Arizona State University launched with 120 founding fathers.

Delta Sig in the 2010s: The Better Man
During the second decade of the 21st Century the fraternity began to see the fruits of its new partnerships and vision. Twenty-two new chapter developments or redevelopments took place between 2009 and 2013, with an average new chapter size of 52 men, one of the highest among NIC men's fraternities. The organization-wide GPA surpassed the 3.0 mark and $100,000 dollars was made available for academic scholarships through the McKee Scholarship. The fraternity's staff grew more than 50 percent from 2011 to 2014.

New programs were announced in 2013 to launch in 2014 including the Presidents' Academy, a service immersion trip (The Journey) and an online education platform titled "The Lamp" to provide membership and leadership development and training to 100 percent of the undergraduate membership by 2015.

In 2014, the fraternity announced a partnership with Alpha Phi Alpha and Alpha Omicron Pi to host "Conversations on Race" at institutions where all three organizations have component chapters. The focus of these events is to create an open forum for students to discuss race and the effects of discrimination in their local and fraternity/sorority communities.

The Better Man
Though Delta Sigma Phi always had a solid and straightforward mission, a process to define what type man the organization wished to recruit and build started in 2013. The fraternity reached out to a number of students, alumni, and volunteers to better understand the key character qualities of an ideal member.

At the 2013 convention in Phoenix, the fraternity revealed the three character qualities of "The Better Man" as mentioned in the fraternity's motto "Better Men. Better Lives." From the founding of the organization until the present, it is believed the best Delta Sigs lead as Men of Courage, Men of Action and Men of Excellence. The new campaign aims to encourage both undergraduate and alumni members to exemplify those principles in all aspects of life.

Symbols

The Sphinx was the first symbol adopted by the fraternity at the time of inception. Chosen for its longevity and stability over centuries. Other symbols include a lamp, a lute (depicted as a lyre), a Gordian Knot, and the Egyptian Pyramids. The white carnation was chosen as the fraternity's official flower because it contains the fraternity's colors; white and nile green as well as being a relatively common and sturdy flower that can grow in almost any climate. The publications of the fraternity are often named after its symbols:

The Sphinx - an esoteric publication for initiated members only
The Gordian Knot - the new member manual
The Lute - the fraternity songbook
The Carnation - a quarterly publication delivered to all members
The pledge emblem is a white circle with a green equilateral triangle set inside of it. Gold lines radiate from the center of the emblem to the three points of the triangle in addition to outlining the circle and triangle. The pledge emblem is very prevalent in the symbolism of the fraternity; not only is the emblem on the pledge pin, but the emblem also graces the flag, the membership badge and the basic design is also the basis of the fraternity's seal.

National programs
Prior to the adoption of Vision 2025, Delta Sigma Phi was providing leadership training and development to fewer than 500 students annually. Since the creation of a number of new programs, more than 1,600 members receive annual leadership development & training from the national organization annually. With the launch of Delta Sig's online learning management system in the fall of 2013, that number will hit 100 percent  of the undergraduate membership by 2015.

Leadership Institute (L.I.)
Delta Sigma Phi's flagship leadership program is the Leadership Institute, celebrating its 20th Anniversary in the summer of 2013. The Leadership Institute is based on Kouzes & Posner's Five Practices of Exemplary Leadership and engages members in a curriculum including large & small group discussions, team-building activities, high-ropes courses, and personal assessment and reflection. Members apply to attend LI, however there is no limit to the number of members that may be admitted from each chapter. It is a 5-day program in Indianapolis each summer (though it was moved to Phoenix in 2013 to coordinate with the 2013 convention for the 20th Anniversary) and is free to undergraduate Delta Sigma Phi members. More than 1,000 men have graduated from the Leadership Institute to date.

Regional events
Regional Leadership Academies (RLAs) were developed following the adoption of Vision 2025 to target a wider audience of the membership and provide development and training on the business and day-to-day operations of chapters. In 2013, Delta Sigma Phi held four RLAs, allowing each chapter to send up to 10 members at no additional cost to its paid in membership dues. The content of the RLAs have changed each year as members needs and requests evolve, though the one-day program has maintained tracks regarding Risk Management & Recruitment since inception.

For the 2012–2013 academic year, RLAs were in Atlanta, Georgia; Indianapolis, Indiana; Philadelphia, Pennsylvania; and Santa Clara, California. Delta Sigma Phi also piloted two statewide regional events in the 2012–13 school year for chapters in Wisconsin, Minnesota and Texas. These chapters were exempted from the requirement to participate in RLA and were invited to bring more than 10 men from each of their memberships. For the 2013–14 academic year, the fraternity expanded the RLA program to 16 state or local-region sessions throughout the fall and spring. With this new concept, roughly 1,600 men were anticipated to participate in RLAs. The new format also followed a linear curriculum, eliminating workshops in favor of a discussion regarding values and leadership intermixed with a number of smaller group breakout sessions and activities.

Bruce J. Lowenberg Summit
Developed in 2008, Summit is a three-day retreat prior to the traditional start of the spring semester for vice presidents of recruitment (VPR) and new member educators. Summit focuses heavily on the best-practices in recruitment and pushes all Delta Sig chapters to use a 365-day outreach process, proven to improve the quality & quantity of chapter membership. Through the fraternity's partnership with Phired Up Productions, Summit has continuously evolved and advanced with regard to the curriculum. In 2013, a new curriculum was developed between the fraternity & Phired Up CEO Josh Orendi to get all chapters "on system," using a names list, year-round outreach programs and to practice "social excellence," a key concept that Phired Up promotes through their recruitment philosophy.

Prior to the 2013–14 academic year, Summit was attended by chapter presidents and VPRs. Presidents now attend the Presidents' Academy.

Since the inception of Summit & Vision 2025, the average chapter size for the national fraternity has grown by more than 10 men and the number of men recruited annually has steadily increased. Also incorporated into Summit are accreditation & risk management training, reducing the number of risk-related incidents by 75% and increasing the number of chapters submitting complete annual accreditation reports from near 50% to over 90% annually.

In 2014, the Summit was endowed with a $1 million donation from Bruce Lowenberg (Missouri, 58) and became the first Fraternity program named after an alumnus or donor.

Presidents' Academy
Starting in the spring term of 2014, chapter presidents will be invited to attend the Presidents' Academy. This program was developed to address the wide variety of responsibilities and expectations of chapter presidents in addition to helping chapter presidents assess themselves as leaders and use their strengths to benefit their chapter. Members take a Strengths Finder assessment and are coached by a professional through their personal strengths and how to best use them to help their chapters achieve annual benchmarks.

The Journey: Service Immersion Trip
In 2014 Delta Sigma Phi Fraternity hosted its first service immersion experience to Honduras in partnership with the Association of Fraternal Leadership and Values (AFLV), the first such partnership. Fifteen undergraduate students attended along with a few staff members from the fraternity and AFLV to learn about the importance of service and intertwine it with the ritual teachings of the fraternity.

The cost is not directly covered by the national fraternity, though scholarships can be given to students whose institutions will offer course credits for the trip through the Delta Sigma Phi Foundation.

Convention
The convention is the Delta Sigma Phi's longest-running national program. July 2015 marked the 59th Biennial & Convention and was hosted by the New Orleans Marriott in New Orleans, Louisiana. The convention serves as an opportunity for members — new and old alike – to meet, share stories, vote on business and elect members to the Grand Council of the fraternity. More than 200 voting delegates and more than 700 men attended this convention, making it the largest in the organization's history.

Educational programming is offered in convention with focus on chapter operations, volunteer development, new national programs and career development. Vendors occupy a space on the floor and the fraternity has national partnerships with Bank of America, Geico & Brooks Brothers including discounts & specialized products.

The Lamp: online education
In 2015 the first phase of Delta Sigma Phi's online learning management system (LMS) launched to provide new member orientation to all new members and to simplify the member-registration process. Chapter resources also were available through the member portal and redesigned as the year progressed to better suit the needs of chapters and to provide a more clear direction as to how chapters can and should operate. The online programming extended to include programming for all members regardless of their status as an undergraduate member or alumnus. The fraternity began by piloting the program with chapters during the F2015 academic term.

Partnership with the American Red Cross
Through a strategic plan of the fraternity, Delta Sigma Phi aims to be the largest single donor of pints of blood, "sweat equity" through community service and philanthropic donations to the American Red Cross by 2025. Blood, Sweat & Cash was developed as a national initiative to envelop the fraternity's efforts for the American Red Cross. The support turned into a recognized partnership in 2013, the same year Delta Sigma Phi developed its "Blood, Sweat & Cash Award" for chapters dedicating outstanding service to Red Cross chapters and national efforts.

Initiatives
The fraternity participates in National Preparedness Month each September and National Red Cross Month each March, the latter being the premiere focus for chapters to raise funds and host spring blood drives. Chapters are encouraged to explore opportunities to help the Red Cross and determine which fits best with their institution. This offers students a chance to innovate and differentiate what they do between chapters.

Most recently, the Beta Psi Chapter of more than 200 men at Arizona State University provided CPR training for all members. The Iota Delta Chapter at James Madison University gained national recognition for its "Restore The Shore" campaign after Hurricane Sandy and chapters across the nation raised thousands of dollars for the victims while participating in the disaster relief effort. In the spring of 2013, the Kappa Delta at Virginia Tech donated $16,000 and 160 pints of blood to the ARC. Most recently, the Beta Kappa Chapter at the University of Alabama raised more than $18,000 in 2014 for the American Red Cross.

Nationally, the fraternity sold "Delta Sig + Red Cross" wristbands to chapters and members wishing to use the wristbands for fundraising efforts. During the first month of availability in September 2013, the fraternity sold more than 3,000 wristbands to component chapters with the intention to open again for orders in the months prior to major national initiatives. The national fraternity and its college campus chapters also engaged in a "Drive for 5" shortly after Typhoon Haiyan and a series of tornados across the U.S. Midwest. Overall, the fraternity and its chapters raised more than $5,000 over the course of a month and donated hundreds of canned food supplies to the Red Cross' disaster relief efforts.

The Delta Sigma Phi Foundation
The Delta Sigma Phi Foundation is a charitable and educational tax-exempt not-for-profit organization, separate and independent from Delta Sigma Phi Fraternity.

Funds raised through the foundation covered the costs of the Leadership Institute while supporting other programs from the fraternity:

McKee Scholarship
The McKee Scholarship program is made available thanks to the generosity of the late Hensel McKee, Washington '30, and his late wife, Jeanette. Scholarships are available to undergraduate members and those alumni members who are pursuing graduate degrees. To be eligible, applicants must have a cumulative grade point average of at least 3.0 on a 4.0 scale and be initiated members of Delta Sigma Phi Fraternity in good standing. In the summer of 2013, the foundation awarded $100,000 in McKee Scholarships to over 40 recipients.

21st Century Funds
Donors to the foundation can delegate their funding to a chapter's 21st Century Fund. These funds may be used for scholarships, computer & networking equipment, libraries and leadership training.

1899 Society
Started in 2002, the 1899 Society recognizes certain donors who show a commitment to Delta Sigma Phi through generous annual or lifetime charitable giving. There are various levels of membership.

Written ideals

The Preamble
The Delta Sigma Phi Fraternity in Convention assembled declares and affirms the following principles:

That the belief in God is essential to our welfare.

That loyalty to the constituted authority of our nations and their subdivisions is a cardinal virtue of our brotherhood, the pledged faith of which shall never be broken; and that our brotherhood, receiving the blessings of liberty, education, and fraternity, shall ever support, foster and defend our universities, colleges, and school systems, founded under the dispensation of our governments and constituting the bulwarks of democracy for us, for our posterity and for all men.

That the sanctity of the home and the sacredness of the family bond, the hearthstone of our enlightened civilization, and the chivalry of man toward woman, shall be maintained and protected by us, not only for ourselves and our posterity, but also for the good of all mankind.

That a symmetrical culture, a fraternal communion among the colleges of this country, and a brotherhood of men, whose ideals and beliefs are those of modern civilization, are essential to the welfare of our college men.

In furtherance of these aims, this fraternity has recognized certain standards of attainment and gentlemanly conduct, expressed in the ideals symbolically represented by the three Greek letters, Delta, Sigma, Phi; and it shall be the constant endeavor of the brothers who may be called to preside over and govern the fraternity, or its component chapters, to enforce the precepts of the fraternity by every reasonable means within their power, and they, and each brother of the fraternity shall exemplify those principles by conduct as well as enforcement in order that the fraternity may grow and prosper with honor to itself and that the world may ever be convinced of the sincerity of our purpose.

Code of conduct for members

In order to fulfill its solemn obligation to help its members reach the highest standards of educational attainment, moral values, and social responsibility, Delta Sigma Phi Fraternity has adopted the following code of conduct for the daily lives of each of their members:

Statement on hazing
Delta Sigma Phi banned "Hell Week" in 1938.

In accordance to the Gordian Knot, the Delta Sigma Phi fraternity states, "Each chapter shall not conduct hazing activities. Hazing activities are defined as any act or attempt to embarrass, humiliate, intimidate, ridicule, shame or endanger physically or mentally any person, or to compel physical activity or do physical or emotional harm to any person, or to require consumption or ingestion of liquids, food, or other materials."

Further, hazing does not promote the air of respect between brothers that Delta Sigma Phi seeks to elevate. "Any man that would haze a brother is not fit for membership in Delta Sigma Phi. Also any man that permits himself to be hazed by a brother is also not fit for membership."

Individual chapter or member misconduct
In 2001, the Kappa chapter at Auburn University had its charter revoked after a Halloween party where members were present in blackface, Ku Klux Klan robes, and simulating a lynching. After being reinstated, their charter was again revoked following numerous incidents involving hazing, vandalism, alcohol and harassment in 2017.

In 2013, the chapter at California State University, East Bay was kicked off campus due to hazing, alcohol, and drug violations.

In 2014, the chapter at San Diego State University was shut down due to a string of hazing and alcohol violations, and misconduct, including waving dildos at protestors during an anti-rape rally on campus.

In 2014, the chapter at Washington State University was suspended after a stint of disciplinary issues with the university.

In 2015, the chapter at University of Arizona was suspended due to multiple hazing and alcohol violations.
 
In 2015, multiple hazing incidents with the chapter at the University of Missouri were made public to the university's leadership.  As a result, the chapter was suspended and placed on probation.

In 2017, the chapter at North Carolina State University was shut down due to multiple violations.

The chapter at the University of Alabama was revoked in May 2018 due to allegations of hazing. The hazing allegations had been ongoing for more than two years. The chapter remained suspended until the fall of 2020 where they were reinstated.

In 2019, the chapter at Duke University was shut down due to reoccurring risk management incidents over 12 months. 

In 2021, the chapter at Columbia University lost its campus housing, allegedly due to hazing.

In July 2022, the chapter at Michigan Technological University was suspended due to hazing violations.

Chapters and New Chapters

Notable alumni

Athletics
Paul Splittorff, Morningside College '68, former Major League pitcher for the Kansas City Royals
Jim Bouton, Western Michigan '59, former Major League pitcher and author of Ball Four
Art Watson, Idaho '02, neck cranker, Special Olympian
Mike Bellotti, UC Davis '70, former head football coach, former athletic director, University of Oregon, Current ESPN analyst 
Mike Shanahan, Eastern Illinois '71,  former head coach of Washington Redskins
Jared Veldheer, Hillsdale College '07, offensive lineman for the Arizona Cardinals
Herb "Fritz" Crisler, former head football coach and athletic director, University of Chicago
Kevin Streelman, "Duke '01", current PGA golfer
Sean Davis, "Duke '14", current Major League Soccer player for the New York Red Bulls
Brian White, "Duke '17", current Major League Soccer player for the New York Red Bulls

Government
David Perdue, "Georgia Institute of Technology '69", senator from Georgia
James J. Davis, Pittsburgh '23, former Secretary of Labor of the United States
Richard Winters, Franklin and Marshall '41, World War II hero, inspiration for the HBO series Band of Brothers
Albert P. Brewer, Alabama '48, former governor, State of Alabama
James W. Holsinger, Duke '58, Surgeon General of the United States nominee
Michael Deaver, San Jose State '59, former Assistant White House Chief of Staff, Reagan Administration
Thomas Harkin, Iowa State '60, United States Senator, State of Iowa
John E. McLaughlin, Wittenberg '61, former deputy (and later interim) director of the Central Intelligence Agency
William Todd Tiahrt, SD School of Mines '70, member, United States House of Representatives, State of Kansas
Admiral Robert Conway, St. Francis College '72, vice admiral, US Navy
William C. Eacho III, Duke '76, US Ambassador to Austria
Mike Turner, Ohio Northern '79, member, United States House of Representatives, State of Ohio
Doyle E. Carlton, "Stetson '09", former governor of Florida (Member of Phi Delta Kappa Society which became Delta Sigma Phi - Alpha Chi Chapter in 1925)
Mark Martin (judge),Western Carolina University '85, Chief Justice of the NC Supreme Court from 2014- 2019.

Entertainment
Steve Pepoon, Kansas State University '75, co-creator of The Wild Thornberrys
Ed O'Neill, Youngstown State University '69", actor
Rob Little, Central Michigan University, comedian
Cody Ko, Duke University, comedian and YouTuber
Printz Board, San Diego State University, Musician, songwriter, producer, recording artist

Education
Robert Carothers, Edinboro of PA '62, past president, University of Rhode Island
Rev. Lawrence Biondi, Loyola '74, president, St. Louis University

Business
Frank T. Cary, Hillsdale, former chairman and CEO, IBM
John M. Harbert, Auburn '46, billionaire businessman from Birmingham, Alabama who started Harbert Corporation
Charles R. Walgreen III, Michigan '55, former president and CEO, Walgreens
Mike Hayden, Kansas State University '64, former governor of Kansas
Mike Duke, Georgia Institute of Technology '68, former CEO of Wal-Mart
John Walden, University of Illinois at Urbana-Champaign '79, CEO of Home Retail Group PLC

See also
List of social fraternities and sororities

References

A Brief History of the Jew in the American College Fraternity By Steve Hofstetter

External links
Delta Sigma Phi Fraternity

 
Student organizations established in 1899
North American Interfraternity Conference
Student societies in the United States
Fraternities and sororities based in Indianapolis
1899 establishments in New York City